Andreea Eliza Chiricuță (born 27 February 1994) is a Romanian handballer who plays as a left for Rapid București.

References
    

1994 births
Living people
People from Buzău
Romanian female handball players